Kozić (Serbian Cyrillic: Козић) is a surname. Notable people with the surname include:

Alen Kozić (born 1976), Yugoslav footballer, son of Refik
Neda Kozić (born 1985), Serbian tennis player and coach
Refik Kozić (born 1950), Yugoslav footballer

Serbian surnames